Liivilepis is an extinct genus of jawless fish belonging to the family Septentrioniidae.

References

External links
 

Birkeniiformes genera
Fossil taxa described in 2002